The British School of Paris (BSP) has provided a British education in Paris since 1954. It is an independent fee-paying school with around 600 pupils, representing well over 50 nationalities. The British School of Paris is the only UK government accredited school in France. The education programme is based on the National Curriculum for England and Wales and its Patron is the serving British Ambassador to France. The school is in the western suburbs of Paris in Croissy-sur-Seine.

History 
Founded by Mary J. Cosyn in 1954, the then 'English School Of Paris' (ESP) moved from its original Parisian address in that same year to the Château de Monte Cristo, Le Port-Marly, just west of Paris and the former home of writer Alexandre Dumas. In the early years most pupils were British, American and Canadian with many parents employed by the Supreme Headquarters of the Allied Powers in Europe (SHAPE). the ESP quickly became the school of choice for military and diplomatic personnel based in Paris.

1954-57 Château de Monte Cristo

The school grew steadily, welcoming both day and boarding pupils. By 1957 a total of 130 pupils on roll prompted a whole school move to more spacious premises in Andrésy, a picturesque village some 13km from the Château de Monte Cristo in Le Port-Marly.

1958-1962 Andrésy

'Le Manoir' at Andrésy offered much more space and proved to be an ideal home for the school for a few years until numbers started to suffer badly largely thanks to the major withdrawal of military personnel from France in the early 1960s. As numbers dropped it also became apparent that the school's relative distance from Paris and high fees were contributing to the downturn; the school needed to find a more accessible location if it hoped to survive. A brief return to the Château de Monte Cristo followed but the future depended upon finding a permanent home.

1964 - Llesna Court, Croissy-sur-Seine

In 1964 the school's permanent home became Llesna Court, 38 quai de l'Ecluse, Croissy-sur-Seine and remains its base today. Slowly the school began to grow again and several new buildings around the grounds followed in due course.

By 1973 the school had acquired a second property in Bougival, specifically to house the Junior School.

By 1980 the school had been transferred from private ownership to become a 'not for profit association' under French law. A Board of Governors was appointed with responsibility for overseeing the running and development of the school and the British Ambassador to France was adopted as the school Patron. In 1981 the school was officially renamed as The British School of Paris and in 2010 a purpose-built Junior School next to the Senior School campus was opened.

Curriculum 
Both the Junior and Senior schools follow the National Curriculum for England and Wales starting with the Early Years Foundation Stage (EYFS) framework continuing to Key Stages 1–5. All Pupils are expected to study French until Year 11 (approximately aged 16). During Key Stage 4 pupils study for the General Certificate of Secondary Education (GCSE) award in a range of subjects. Students progressing into Key Stage 5 (Sixth Form) study for Advanced Level (A Level) examinations, usually three or four subjects.

Accreditation / Inspection Reports 
The BSP is the only UK government accredited British school overseas (BSO) in France. The school is inspected by the Independent School Inspectorate ISI, a government approved independent inspectorate, quality assured on behalf of the Department for Education. The BSP is subject to regular inspections by the ISI to ensure rigorous standards are maintained. The ISI is also an approved independent inspectorate of British Schools Overseas (BSO).

ISI reports 2019

ISI report 2014

The Headmaster is a member of HMC (the Headmasters' and Headmistresses' Conference). The School is a member of IAPS (the Independent Association of Prep Schools) and COBIS (Council of British International Schools).

Buildings 
The Junior and Senior School campuses are adjacent. The Senior School buildings include a nineteenth century Manor House, Science, Humanities, Modern Languages and Maths/Music blocks, an indoor multi-purpose hall, an all-weather sport pitch, drama studio and outdoor performance amphitheatre. The Junior School is a purpose-built campus opened in 2010.

Student Welfare/Pastoral Care 
Student Welfare is an integral part of the National Curriculum and it is supported at the BSP by the compulsory Personal, Social, Health and Economic (PSHE) classes.

Co-curricular 
The BSP has a wide-ranging co-curricular programme including sports such as basketball, cricket, cross country, football, netball and rugby and non-sporting activities such as chess, debating, DofE, Investor club, drama, school show, Maths competition club, orchestra, science, jazz bands.

School Motto 
The School Motto is Validus Corpore Animoque (strength in body and mind).
The School's core values are: Excellence and Integrity, Determination and Endeavour, Community and Service and Discovery and Opportunity.

See also 
 Lycée Français Charles de Gaulle
 Lycée International de Londres Winston Churchill

References

External links 
BSP home page
The British School of Paris
The British School of Paris | Expat Arrivals
Site Search
‘The French are looking to see how we do things’

Educational institutions established in 1954
International schools in Île-de-France
Private schools in France
Member schools of the Headmasters' and Headmistresses' Conference
1954 establishments in France
British international schools in France
Schools in Yvelines
Secondary schools in France
Lycées in Yvelines